Trevor Letowski (born April 5, 1977) is a Canadian ice hockey coach and former professional player. Letowski played in the National Hockey League (NHL) with the Phoenix Coyotes, Vancouver Canucks, Columbus Blue Jackets, and the Carolina Hurricanes. Letowski was the head coach of the OHL's Sarnia Sting and the Windsor Spitfires. Letowski is currently an assistant coach for the NHL's Montreal Canadiens.

Playing career
Letowski began his career playing junior hockey for the Sarnia Sting of the Ontario Hockey League. Letowski was drafted in the seventh round, 174th overall by the Phoenix Coyotes in the 1996 NHL Entry Draft. The Sting named him Rookie of the Year for the 1994–95 season. Letowski won a gold medal with Team Canada at the World Junior Championships in Switzerland in 1997.  A banner depicting his number 17 in Canadian national team colours hangs at the Progressive Auto Sales Arena in Sarnia, Ontario, where the Sting play.

After his third and final season with the Sting, Letowski spent the 1997–98 season with the Springfield Falcons, Phoenix's American Hockey League affiliate.  Letowski made his NHL debut in 1998–99 and became a regular in the Coyotes lineup, playing two full seasons. Midway through the 2001–02 season on December 28, 2001, Letowski was traded by the Coyotes, along with Todd Warriner and Tyler Bouck, to the Vancouver Canucks for Drake Berehowsky and Denis Pederson.

Letowski was signed by the Columbus Blue Jackets as a free agent on July 3, 2003, and played two seasons there split by a term in Switzerland with HC Fribourg-Gottéron of the Swiss Nationalliga A during the 2004–05 NHL lockout. Letowski joined the Carolina Hurricanes as a free agent on July 6, 2006 and played there for two seasons.

During a game against the Pittsburgh Penguins on October 14, 2006, Letowski was hit by the Penguins' Colby Armstrong following a pass in the Penguins' zone.  Letowski was knocked unconscious and removed from the ice on a stretcher.  There was no penalty on the play.

Letowski joined Barys Astana as a free agent on August 3, 2008. Following the conclusion of the 2009–10 season, his second year with Astana, Letowski announced his retirement.

Letwoski returned to where he began his career with the Sting, taking up an assistant coaching role on April 17, 2010, for the 2010–11 season, however, on February 6, 2011, Dave MacQueen was fired as head coach and GM and Letowski took over serving as interim head coach. In 18 games as the head coach, the Sting went 7–10–1, as they missed the playoffs for the second straight season. He returned to his assistant position under the Sting's next head coach, Jacques Beaulieu in 2011–12. He was promoted to head coach on June 14, 2013.

On July 9, 2015, Letowski was hired by the Windsor Spitfires as their assistant coach, after previous assistant coach Bob Jones was hired by the Oshawa Generals. After two seasons, he was promoted to head coach of the Spitfires in 2017 when Rocky Thompson left to become the head coach of the Chicago Wolves in the American Hockey League. In 2021, he was hired by the Montreal Canadiens of the National Hockey League as an assistant coach.

Career statistics

Regular season and playoffs

International

Coaching record

References

External links

1977 births
Living people
Barys Nur-Sultan players
Canadian ice hockey right wingers
Carolina Hurricanes players
Columbus Blue Jackets players
HC Fribourg-Gottéron players
Ice hockey people from Ontario
Sportspeople from Thunder Bay
Arizona Coyotes draft picks
Phoenix Coyotes players
Sarnia Sting coaches
Sarnia Sting players
Springfield Falcons players
Vancouver Canucks players
Windsor Spitfires coaches
Canadian ice hockey coaches
Montreal Canadiens coaches